Timo Antero Kotipelto (born 15 March 1969) is a Finnish musician best known as the lead singer of the power metal band Stratovarius, whom he joined in 1994, as well as fronting his own band Kotipelto.

Biography

He studied vocals at the pop/jazz conservatory in Helsinki, briefly singing for an amateur cover band named Filthy Asses. In summer of 1994, he applied to Stratovarius, who were looking for a singer at the time, and was accepted. His arrival corresponds closely with the band's rise to international fame. The first album he recorded with the band was Fourth Dimension, in 1995. Stratovarius has then become a top name in the European heavy metal scene, recording seven more albums and performing in numerous notable rock festivals.

In late 2003, Kotipelto split from Stratovarius after intra-band disagreements, notably with guitarist Timo Tolkki. After much turmoil throughout 2004, he rejoined the band in January 2005, recorded the album Stratovarius, and performed live on tour that covered North America, South America, Europe and Asia. In 2008, Timo Tolkki made public that he and Timo Kotipelto had arguments but Kotipelto never really left the band and the announcement that he left was part of a big publicity stunt.

In 2002 Kotipelto started his solo project, called Kotipelto. So far he has released three albums: "Waiting For The Dawn", "Coldness" and the last one, released 20 April 2007, "Serenity". 
Aside from Stratovarius and Kotipelto, Timo Kotipelto has also provided additional vocals to Sonata Arctica's Silence album along with lead vocals with his close friend, ex-Sonata Arctica guitarist Jani Liimatainen and his band Cain's Offering. and lead vocals for the song "Out of the White Hole", on Ayreon's 2000 release Universal Migrator Part 2: Flight of the Migrator.

Kotipelto also provided vocals for the track "Eye of the Storm" on Warmen's 2009 album Japanese Hospitality.

Discography

With Stratovarius
Fourth Dimension (1995)
Episode (1996)
Visions (1997)
The Past and Now (Compilation, 1997)
Visions of Europe (Live, 1998)
Destiny (1998)
"Visions Of Destiny" (DVD, 1999)
The Chosen Ones (Compilation, 1999)
Infinite (2000)
"14 Diamonds - Best Of Stratovarius" (Compilation, 2000)
Infinite Visions (DVD, 2000)
Intermission (2001)
Elements, Pt. 1 (2003)
Elements, Pt. 2 (2003)
Stratovarius (2005)
"Black Diamond: The Anthology" (Compilation, 2006)
Polaris (2009)
"Polaris live" (2010)
Elysium (2011)
"Under Flaming Winter Skies (Live in Tampere - The Jörg Michael Farewell Tour)" (DVD, 2012)
"Under Flaming Winter Skies – Live in Tampere" (Live, 2012)
Nemesis (2013)
"Nemesis Days" (DVD, 2014)
Eternal (2015)
Best Of (2016)
Enigma: Intermission 2 (2018)
Survive (2022)

Kotipelto
Waiting for the Dawn (2002)
Coldness (2004)
Serenity (2007)

With Cain's Offering
Gather the Faithful (2009)
Stormcrow (2015)

Kotipelto & Liimatainen
Blackoustic (2012)

Guest appearances

With Gamma Ray
 Time To Break Free Song live (1996)

With Tarot
 For The Glory of Nothing (1998) – Backing vocals on 'Warhead' and 'Beyond TroyWith Tunnelvision
 While The World Awaits (2000) - Backing vocals

Timo Kotipelto and Klaus Flaming
 I Wanna Love You Tender (cover of Danny & Army) (2002)

With Warmen
 Beyond Abilities (2002) – Vocals on 'Spark' and 'Singer's Chance Accept the Fact (2005) – Vocals on 'Invisible Power' and 'Puppet'''
 Japanese Hospitality (2009) – Vocals on 'Eye of the Storm

With Sonata ArcticaSilence (2001) – Backing vocals and last line on 'False News Travel FastStones Grow Her Name (2012) – Backing vocalsWith KlamydiaSeokset (2003)  – Vocals on 'Metanol Man'With Ayreon
 Universal Migrator Part 2: Flight of the Migrator (2000) – Vocals on 'Out of the White Hole (M31 – Planet Y – The Search Continues)Monstervision Freakshow
 Welcome to Hellsinki (2007)

With Ella Ja Aleksi
 Takapihan Tavikset (2009)

With Leningrad Cowboys
 I Will Stay          (2006)
 Let's Have A Party   (2006)

With Amberian DawnCircus Black (2012) – Vocals on 'Cold Kiss

With HevisaurusRäyhällistä joulua (2011) – Vocals on 'Pieni liekkiBändikouluun (2019) – Vocals on '100'With SoulspellThe Second Big Bang (2017)The End You'll Only Know at the End (2017)Alexandria (Apocalypse version) (2017)

With La suma de las partes

 Vergel (2020) - Vocal on "Rain In The Ocean"With Tarja

 Feliz Navidad (2017) - Vocal on "Feliz Navidad"
 From Spirits and Ghosts (Score for a Dark Christmas) (2020) - Vocal on "Feliz Navidad (Barbuda Relief and Recovery Charity Version)"

With Jani Liimatainen

 My Father's Son (2022) - Vocal on "Who Are We" &  "Into The Fray"''

References

External links
    Official website

1969 births
Living people
People from Lappajärvi
Finnish heavy metal guitarists
Finnish heavy metal singers
Stratovarius members
English-language singers from Finland
Cain's Offering members